Captain Andrew Cooney, FRGS, AFRIN, of the Royal Logistic Corps, Territorial Army, was the youngest man to walk to the South Pole.

A native of Thurgarton, he attended Southwell Minster School, which he left at age 16 to study electronic and computer engineering at Southampton Institute, earning his BA (Hons) in Maritime Leisure Management.

Cooney joined the Scouts  and earned the highest scouting award (the Queen Scout), later completing the Bronze, Silver and Gold Awards under the aegis of the Duke of Edinburgh's Award Scheme. He has since founded his own business, delivering presentations, workshops and university lectures across the UK to young people.

Affiliations
 Fellow, Royal Geographical Society
 Associate Fellow, Royal Institute of Navigation

References
 http://news.bbc.co.uk/2/hi/uk_news/england/nottinghamshire/6382175.stm
 http://newsroom.haas.berkeley.edu/article/berkeley-mba-students-plan-pioneering-polar-expedition

Year of birth missing (living people)
Living people
Royal Logistic Corps officers
People educated at Southwell Minster School
People from Newark and Sherwood (district)
Alumni of the University of Southampton
Fellows of the Royal Geographical Society